The canton of Haute Lande Armagnac is an administrative division of the Landes department, southwestern France. It was created at the French canton reorganisation which came into effect in March 2015. Its seat is in Labrit.

It consists of the following communes:
 
Argelouse
Arue
Arx
Baudignan
Bélis
Betbezer-d'Armagnac
Bourriot-Bergonce
Brocas
Cachen
Callen
Canenx-et-Réaut
Cère
Commensacq
Créon-d'Armagnac
Escalans
Escource
Estigarde
Gabarret
Garein
Herré
Labastide-d'Armagnac
Labouheyre
Labrit
Lagrange
Lencouacq
Losse
Lubbon
Luglon
Luxey
Maillas
Maillères
Mauvezin-d'Armagnac
Parleboscq
Retjons
Rimbez-et-Baudiets
Roquefort
Sabres
Saint-Gor
Saint-Julien-d'Armagnac
Saint-Justin
Sarbazan
Le Sen
Solférino
Sore
Trensacq
Vert
Vielle-Soubiran

References

Cantons of Landes (department)